Identify Yourself is a 1979 album by American R&B group The O'Jays, released on the Philadelphia International Records label. It was recorded at Sigma Sound Studios in Philadelphia, with four tracks produced by Kenny Gamble and Leon Huff, three by group members Eddie Levert and Walter Williams and one by the esteemed Philadelphia producer and composer Thom Bell.

The album reached No. 3 on the US R&B albums chart and No. 16 on the pop albums chart, and was certified platinum for sales of over one million copies sold. Two singles from the album reached the top ten on the R&B singles chart in the United States: "Sing a Happy Song" (No. 7) and "Forever Mine" (No. 4); the latter peaking at No. 28 on the Billboard Hot 100, and the group's last single to reach the pop top 50.

Track listing
All songs written by Kenneth Gamble and Leon Huff, except where noted.

Side one
"Sing a Happy Song" - 5:03
"Get On Out and Party" (Walter Williams, Terry Stubbs, Leroy Simmons, Mike Jackson) - 5:04
"Identify" - 4:56
"So Nice I Tried It Twice" (Williams, Jackson, Willie Ross) - 5:50

Side two
"Hurry Up and Come Back" (Eddie Levert, Jackson, Williams) - 5:09
"Forever Mine" - 6:10
"I Want You Here with Me" - 5:28
"One in a Million (Girl)" (Thom Bell, Joseph Ericksen) - 3:55

Personnel
Eddie Levert, Walter Williams, Sammy Strain - vocals
Don Renaldo - horns, strings
Roland Chambers, Dennis Harris, Anthony Bell, Bobby Eli - guitar
Quinton Joseph, Leon "Ndugu" Chancler, Charles Collins - drums
James Williams, Willie Ross, Bob Babbitt - bass guitar
James Mtume, David Cruse - percussion
Leon Huff, Mike Jackson, Thom Bell - keyboards
Lenny Pakula, Dunn Pearson - organ
Ed Shea - timpanies

Charts

Weekly charts

Year-end charts

Singles
"Sing a Happy Song" (US R&B No. 7, UK No. 39)
"I Want You Here with Me" (US R&B No. 49)
"Forever Mine" (US R&B #4, US Pop No. 28)
"Hurry Up and Come Back"

References

1979 albums
The O'Jays albums
Philadelphia International Records albums
Albums produced by Kenneth Gamble
Albums produced by Leon Huff
Albums produced by Thom Bell
Albums recorded at Sigma Sound Studios